Sinentomon is the only genus in the family Sinentomidae, in the hexapod order Protura. It contains three species found in China, Japan, and North Korea.

Species
 Sinentomon chui Tuxen & Paik, 1982
 Sinentomon erythranum Yin, 1965
 Sinentomon yoroi Imadaté, 1977

References

Protura